Chavinillo is a town in central Peru, capital of Yarowilca Province in Huánuco Region.

Populated places in the Huánuco Region